Omidcheh (also Romanized as Omīdcheh; also known as Emichah) is a village in Arshaq-e Shomali Rural District, Arshaq District, Meshgin Shahr County, Ardabil Province, Iran. At the 2006 census, its population was 121, in 28 families.

References 

Towns and villages in Meshgin Shahr County